The French 2nd Light Cavalry Division (2e Division de Cavalerie Légère) was a French Army division active during World War II.

World War II

Battle Of France
During the Battle of France in May 1940 the division contained the following units:

3rd Cavalry Brigade (3e Brigade de Cavalerie)
18th Mounted Hunters Regiment (18e Régiment de Chasseurs à Cheval)
5th Cuirassier Regiment (5e Regiment de Cuirassier)
12th Light Mechanized Brigade (12e Brigade Légère Mécanisée)
2nd Armoured Car Regiment (2e Régiment de Voitures Blindées)
3rd Mechanized Dragoon Regiment (3e régiment de dragons portés)
73rd Divisionary Light Cavalry Artillery Regiment (73e Régiment d’Artillerie de Division Légère de Cavalerie)

References

2
Cavalry divisions of France
Military units and formations disestablished in the 1940s